Ihab Francis Ilyas (born May 13, 1973) is a computer scientist who works in data science. He is currently a professor of computer science in the David R. Cheriton School of Computer Science at the University of Waterloo. He also leads the Knowledge  Platform team at Apple Inc.. Ihab is the holder of the Thomson Reuters-NSERC Industrial Research Chair in Data Cleaning at the University of Waterloo.

Ilyas co-founded Tamr Inc., a start-up focusing on large-scale data integration and cleaning, with Andy Palmer and Michael Stonebraker, a Turing Award winner. Ilyas was the CEO of Inductiv Inc., an artificial intelligence start-up that uses machine learning to automate the task of identifying and correcting errors in data, which he co-founded with Theodoros Rekatsinas at the University of Wisconsin-Madison and Christopher Ré at Stanford University. Inductiv was acquired by Apple Inc. in May 2020.

Education and career

Ilyas was born and raised in Alexandria, Egypt. After completing bachelor's and master's degrees at Alexandria University in 1995 and 1999, respectively, he earned a PhD at Purdue University in 2004 under the supervision of Walid Aref and Ahmed K. Elmagarmid.

After his doctoral studies, Ilyas accepted a position in 2004 as a tenure-track professor at the University of Waterloo's David R. Cheriton School of Computer Science.

Research contributions

Ilyas is best known for the development of database systems and data science, with emphasis on data quality, data cleaning, managing uncertain data, machine learning for data curation, and rank-aware query processing.

Since 2009, he has focused research on data quality and the technical challenges in building data-cleaning systems. He and his research group introduced novel practical algorithms and system prototypes, which circumvent limitations of previous data-cleaning solutions that either focus narrowly on single types of data errors or ignore real-life considerations that prevent their adoption.

With Theodoros Rekatsinas, Christopher Ré, and Xu Chu, he introduced HoloClean, an open-source statistical inference engine to impute, clean and enrich data.

Awards and honours

Ilyas received a Government of Ontario Early Researcher Award in 2008, a provincial program that funds new leading researchers at publicly funded Ontario universities to build a research team. He was named an IBM Canada Advanced Studies Fellow from 2006 to 2010.

Ilyas held a Cheriton Faculty Fellowship at the David R. Cheriton School of Computer Science from 2013 to 2016 and he received the Google Faculty Award in 2014.

He was named an ACM Distinguished Scientist in 2014, and an ACM Fellow in 2020 for his contributions to data cleaning and data integration. He was also named IEEE Fellow in 2022 for his contributions in data cleaning, data integration and rank-aware query processing Since 2018, Ilyas has held the Thomson Reuters-NSERC Industrial Research Chair in Data Cleaning. In 2020, he was named a Faculty Affiliate at the Vector Institute.

Service

Ilyas was elected a member of Board of Trustees of the Very Large Data Bases Endowment in 2016 and the Vice Chair of the ACM Special Interest Group on Data Management (SIGMOD) in 2017.

References

External links
 
 

Egyptian computer scientists
Canadian computer scientists
Egyptian emigrants to Canada
Academic staff of the University of Waterloo
Purdue University alumni
Alexandria University alumni
Living people
1973 births
People from Alexandria
Database researchers